Disruptor Records is an American record label founded by Adam Alpert in September 2014, as a joint venture with Sony Music Entertainment. The label has sold more than 15 million singles worldwide as of 2016.

History 
Alpert founded the label in 2014, alongside his clients' musical group The Chainsmokers, whom he also helped to form by introducing the members, Andrew Taggart and Alex Pall in 2012. The Chainsmokers released several chart-topping songs with the label such as "Closer", "Paris", and "Something Just Like This".

Alpert said, "We care about the artist’s career as a whole and not just about the records — that’s the foundation upon which Disruptor was built." In 2014, he signed the joint venture with Sony Music Entertainment CEO Doug Morris, who was replaced by Rob Stringer and launched Disruptor Records, Disruptor Management and Selector Songs.

The name "Disruptor" as described by Alpert, is "about shaking things up". The label would focus on the long-term development of artists through artist-to-fan communication.

Disruptor Records roster
The Chainsmokers
Dove Cameron
Ritt Momney
Christian French
Emmy Meli
Lost Kings
Slush Puppy
Dava (singer)

Disruptor Management roster 

 The Chainsmokers
 Jessie Murph
 Dove Cameron
 Gashi
 Don Diablo
 Lost Kings
 Maude Latour
 Young Bombs

References

American record labels
Sony Music
Sony subsidiaries